Ishwor Prasad Khatiwada (born 7 March 1959 in Udayapur, Nepal) is a Nepalese judge. He is currently a justice of the Supreme Court of Nepal. He was appointed as a Supreme Court Justice on 1 August 2016 by the President of Nepal. Prior to his appointment as a Justice of the Supreme Court, he had served as a Chief Judge of Court of Appeals (High Court). Before that he was a Judge of Court of Appeals and District Court for more than 20 years. Justice Khatiwada has also served as a senior prosecutor (Joint Attorney) at the Office of the Attorney General. During his career, apart from his responsibilities as a Judge, Justice Khatiwada has worked on a number of high-level investigations, including the death of former General Secretary of Communist Party of Nepal and Royal Massacre of 2001. Justice Khatiwada regularly speaks and lectures on the issues of law and Judicial Process at National Judicial Academy and other Academic Institutions of Nepal. In 2006/2007, he served as the General Secretary of the Judges Society of Nepal. Justice Khatiwada holds Bachelors of Law and Masters of Political Science from Tribhuwan University, Masters of Laws in Tax Law and Constitution from Punjab University, Chandigarh India. In 2004/2005 he was a Research Fellow at Danish Institute of Human Rights in Denmark and researched on Fair Trial in Cases of Children in Conflict with Law.

See also
 Deepak Raj Joshee
 Gopal Prasad Parajuli

References

External links
 Supreme Court of Nepal

Living people
Justices of the Supreme Court of Nepal
1959 births
Nepalese Hindus
People from Udayapur District
Khas people